Nepenthes pantaronensis is a tropical pitcher plant native to the Philippines. It is known only from Mount Sumagaya and the Pantaron Mountain Range of central Mindanao, where it grows in lower and upper montane forest. On Mount Sumagaya it is sympatric with N. sumagaya and possible hybrids between these species have been recorded. Nepenthes pantaronensis is closely allied to N. petiolata and N. pulchra, both also from Mindanao.

The specific epithet pantaronensis refers to the Pantaron Mountain Range, where the species was discovered.

The discovery and recognition of this taxon as a new species was announced online in September 2012, under the placeholder name "Nepenthes species 5".

References

 Mey, F.S. 2014. Four new species of Nepenthes from the Philippines. Strange Fruits: A Garden's Chronicle, 27 June 2014.

Carnivorous plants of Asia
pantaronensis
Endemic flora of the Philippines
Flora of Mindanao
Plants described in 2014